"Never Comin Down" is a song recorded by New Zealand-born Australian country music artist Keith Urban, released in August 2018 as the third single from his 2018 album Graffiti U. The song was written by Josh Kerr, James Abrahart and Shy Carter. Urban and Kerr are also the producers.

Background and content
iHeartRadio wrote of the song that "The video, set in a club, reflects the song’s lyrics about having a good time on a night out with friends...Although the usual country elements are present, including some banjo licks, the track features heavy bass and some beatbox." The video for the song features Urban as a Lyft driver heading to a party.

Charts

Weekly charts

Year-end charts

References

2018 songs
2018 singles
Keith Urban songs
Capitol Records Nashville singles
Songs written by James Abrahart
Songs written by Shy Carter